The President of Uruguay no longer uses an exclusive presidential aircraft. Instead, he flies in Air Force aircraft.

Current aircraft
The President of Uruguay, currently uses an Embraer EMB 120 Brasilia, operated by the Uruguayan Air Force for flights within South America.

1965–1981
Between 1965 and 1981, the presidential aircraft was a C-47 Dakota (Uruguayan Air Force 507).

1981–1988
In 1981, president Gregorio Alvarez bought a Learjet 35, which was sold by president Julio Maria Sanguinetti in 1988.

2006 Presidential aircraft controversy
On July 6, 2006, president Vazquez announced he was interested in acquiring a presidential aircraft to make his trips cheaper. He even mentioned the possibility of selling one or more old Air Force planes and use the money to afford the new one. However, this announcement led to a scandal with people arguing that the first center-left president in a third world country couldn't make such a frivolous waste of money.

See also
Air transports of heads of state
Uruguayan Air Force
Pluna
Russian presidential aircraft - Official aircraft of the President of Russia

References

External links
Uruguayan Air Force Official website
Pluna official website
Presidency of Uruguay official website

Uruguay
Government of Uruguay
Vehicles of Uruguay